Atre or Atri (Athri) is a Hindu Brahmin patronymic surname and gotra from the ancient sage. In Maharastra, the surname is mainly found among Deshastha Brahmin community. In Madhya Pradesh & Gujarat, the surname is found among Narmadiy Brahmins. It is also a gotra in the Gowda Saraswat Brahmin community 

Notable people with the surname includes
Pralhad Keshav Atre (1898–1969), Marathi writer, poet, educationist, movie producer–director–script writer and orator
Shubhangi Atre, Indian television actress
Prabha Atre, Indian classical vocalist from the Kirana gharana
Shaku Atre (born 1940), Indian-born American data scientist and businesswoman

References

Indian surnames